Team 10 – just as often referred to as Team X or Team Ten – was a group of architects and other invited participants who assembled starting in July 1953 at the 9th Congress of the International Congresses of Modern Architecture (CIAM) and created a schism within CIAM by challenging its doctrinaire approach to urbanism.

Membership
The group's first formal meeting under the name of Team 10 took place in Bagnols-sur-Cèze in 1960. The last, with only four members present, was in Lisbon in 1981.

Team 10 had a fluid membership yet a core group actively organized the various meetings, which consisted of Alison and Peter Smithson, Jaap Bakema, Aldo van Eyck, Georges Candilis, Shadrach Woods, and Giancarlo De Carlo. Other members included Ralph Erskine, Daniel van Ginkel, Pancho Guedes, Geir Grung, Oskar Hansen, Reima Pietilä, Charles Polonyi, Brian Richards, Jerzy Sołtan, Oswald Mathias Ungers, John Voelcker, and Stefan Wewerka.

They referred to themselves as "a small family group of architects who have sought each other out because each has found the help of the others necessary to the development and understanding of their own individual work." Team 10's theoretical framework, disseminated primarily through teaching and publications, had a profound influence on the development of architectural thought in the second half of the 20th century, primarily in Europe and the United States.

Two different movements were associated with Team 10: the New Brutalism of the British members (Alison and Peter Smithson) and the Structuralism of the Dutch members (Aldo van Eyck and Jaap Bakema).

History
Team 10's core group started meeting within the context of CIAM, the international platform for modern architects founded in 1928. Their views often opposed the philosophies put forward by CIAM, and following founder Le Corbusier's exit in 1955, CIAM dissolved in 1959 to give way to Team 10 as the centralized, authoritative think tank concerning Brutalism, Structuralism, and related urban planning. 

When Jaap Bakema, one of Team 10's core members, died in 1981, the other members used this as an occasion to end their collaboration as Team 10.

Bibliography
 Plunz, Richard (22 May 2017) City Riffs: Urbanism,Ecology,Place; Lars Muller publisher;English; ; (pages 91–96: Team 10 influence at U.S.Architecture Schools)
 Risselada, Max and van den Heuvel, Dirk  (eds), Team 10 1953–1981, In Search of A Utopia of the Present, Published by: NAi Publishers, Rotterdam 2005, .
 Avermaete, Tom, Another Modern: The Postwar Architecture and Urbanism of Candilis-Josic-Woods, Published by: NAi Publishers, Rotterdam 2005.
 Smithson, Alison, ed., Team 10 Primer, MIT Press, Boston, 1968, 
 Smithson, Alison, ed., Team 10 Meetings: 1953–1984, Delft/New York 1991
 Smithson, A., The City Centre Full of Holes, Architecture Association Quarterly 1977, no. 2–3, 4–23
 Smithson, A. and P. Smithson, The Heroic Period of Modern Architecture, London/Milan 1981 [reprint of Architectural Design December 1965]
 Smithson, P., Three Generations, in: ILA&UD Annual Report 1980, Urbino 1981
 Smithson, A. (ed.), The Emergence of Team 10 out of CIAM: Documents, London 1982
 Smithson, A., and P. Smithson, The Shift, London 1982 Smithson, P., To Establish a Territory, in: ILA&UD Annual Report 1985–86, Siena 1986
 Smithson, P., Conglomerate Ordering, in: ILA&UD Annual Report 1986–87, Siena 1987
 Smithson, A. and P. Smithson, Thirty Years of Thoughts on the House and Housing 1951–1981, in: D. Lasdun (ed.), Architecture in an Age of Scepticism, London 1984, 172–191
 Smithson, A., Héritage: Carré Bleu, Paris, Le Carré Bleu 1988, summer
 Smithson, A. and P. Smithson, Italian Thoughts, Stockholm 1993
 Smithson, P., Markers on the Land, ILA&UD Annual Report 1992–1993, Urbino 1993
 Smithson, A., and P. Smithson, Whatever Happened to Metabolism? A Summons to the Fourth Generation, The Japan Architect 1988, April
 Smithson, A. and P. Smithson, Changing the Art of Inhabitation; Mies  Pieces, Eames Dreams, The Smithsons, London 1994
 Smithson, A. and P. Smithson, The Charged Void: Architecture, New York 2001
 Smithson, A. and P. Smithson, The Charged Void: Urbanism, New York 2005
 Vidotto, M., Alison and Peter Smithson: Work and Projects, Barcelona 1997
 Bakema, J., Gedachten achter architectuur, Rotterdam 1977
 Bakema, J.B., Thoughts About Architecture, London/New York 1981
 Eyck, A. van, Imagination and Competence : No Misplaced Suburbia / The Enigma of Size, Spazio e Società 1979, no. 8, December, 43–78
 Eyck, A. van, What Is and What Isn't Architecture; à propos of Rats, Posts and Other Pests (R.P.P.), Lotus International 1981, no. 28, 15–20
 Eyck, A. van, World Architecture 1983, no. 22, special issue, 22–45
 Eyck, A. van, Wasted Gain, in: D. Lasdun (ed.), Architecture in an Age of Scepticism, London 1984, 234–253
 Eyck, A. van, and H. van Eyck, Recent Work, Amsterdam 1989, with contributions by P. Buchanan, L. Lefaivre and A. Tzonis
 Bohigas, O., Aldo Van Eyck or a New Amsterdam School, Oppositions 1977, no. 9, 21–36
 Correa, F., Aldo van Eyck: a biographical conversation, Arquitecturas Bis 1977, no. 19, 17–21
 Santis, P. De, Aldo van Eyck : scritti e architettura, Florence 2003
 Strauven, F. (ed.), Niet om het even  wel evenwaardig; van en over Aldo van Eyck, Rotterdam 1986
 Strauven, F., Aldo van Eyck: The Shape of Relativity, Amsterdam 1998
 Candilis, G., ‘Housing and Development, CAU 1980, no. 68, 46–57
 Avermaete, T., Travelling Notions of Public and Private: The French Mass Tourism Projects of Candilis-Josic-Woods, OASE 2004, no. 64, 16–45
 Erskine, R., Democratic Architecture: The Universal and Useful Art, in: D. Lasdun (ed.), Architecture in an Age of Scepticism, London 1984, 72–93
 Egelius, M., Ralph Erskine: Architect, Stockholm 1990
 Carlo, G. De, The University Centre, Urbino, in: D. Lasdun (ed.), Architecture in an Age of Scepticism, London 1984, 50–71
 Carlo, G. De, and F. Karrer, Paesaggio con figure  [interview], Spazio e Società 1988, no. 41
 Carlo, G. De, A New Theory of Urban Design, Spazio e Società 1990, no. 49
 Carlo, G. De, Architecture and the Spirit of Place, Building Design 1993, no. 1151, November, 17–23
 Carlo, G. De, Feminine Virtues; Alison Smithson, a Courageous Utopian, Architects  Journal 1993, no. 8, 18–19
 Karrer, F. and G. De Carlo, Architecture, Urban Planning, Society, Domus 1988, no. 695, 17–28
 McKean, J., Giancarlo De Carlo: Layered Places, Stuttgart 2004* Carlo, G. De, Notes on the Uncontrollable Ascent of Typology, Casabella 1985, no. 509–510, 46–51
 Maki, F. (ed.), De Carlo, Space Design 1987, no. 274, special issue, 6–64
 Pesci, R.O., Giancarlo De Carlo: From the Centre to the Periphery, Summa 1986, no. 225, 28–46
 Rossi, L., Giancarlo De Carlo: architetture, Milan 1988
 Avermaete, T., Mat-Building. Alison Smithson's Concept of Two Dimensional Density, in: Heynen, H., Vandenburgh, D. (eds.), Inside Density, Brussels 2003, 65–75
 Gunay, B., History of CIAM and Team 10, METU, journal of faculty of architecture 1988, no. 1, 23–44
 Johnston, P., (ed.), Architecture Is Not Made with the Brain: The Labour of Alison and Peter Smithson, London 2005
 Le Carré Bleu 1958–88, Architettura; cronache e storia 1989, no. 5 (403), May, 355–375
 Banham, R., The New Brutalism: Ethic or Aesthetic?, London 1966
 Lüchinger, A., Strukturalismus in Architektur und Städtebau / Structuralism in Architecture and Urban Planning / Structuralisme en architecture et urbanisme, Stuttgart 1980
 Mumford, E., The CIAM Discourse on Urbanism: 1928–1960, Cambridge, Massachusetts 2000
 Mumford, E., The Emergence of Mat or Field Buildings, in: Sarkis H. (ed), CASE: Le Corbusier's Venice Hospital and the Mat Building Revival, Munich/New York 2001, 48–65
 Pedret, A., CIAM and the Emergence of Team 10 Thinking, 1945–1959, PhD dissertation, MIT 2001
 Sarkis, H., et al. (ed.), CASE: Le Corbusier's Venice Hospital and the Mat Building Revival, Munich/New York 2001
 Zardini, M., Dal Team X al Team x From Team X to Team x, Lotus international 1997, no. 95, 76–97
 Stanek, L. ed., Team 10 East. Revisionist Architecture in Real Existing Modernism (Warsaw: Museum of Modern Art/ Chicago: University of Chicago Press, 2014)

References

External links

 Team 10 online
lecarrebleu.eu

.
Architecture groups
Urban planning organizations
Architectural theory
Architectural theoreticians
1950s architecture
1960s architecture
1970s architecture
Arts organizations established in 1953
Organizations disestablished in 1981